 
Republican Jesus or GOP Jesus is a meme satirizing Republican socially conservative and neolibertarian Christians whose values appear antithetical to the Gospels, a Jesus who "loves borders, guns, unborn babies, and economic prosperity and hates homosexuality, taxes, welfare, and universal healthcare", and for whom the ten commandments take precedence over the beatitudes. Republican Jesus memes "often spotlight contradictions between Christian values/beliefs and Republican policies/ideals".

A viral video titled "GOP Jesus" portrayed Jesus as if he had adopted Republican policies. It referenced well-known passages including Matthew 25:35-40, satirised as "I was hungry and you gave me something to eat. I was thirsty and you gave me something to drink. And behold, now I’m all lazy and entitled. You shouldn’t have done that". In one scene satirising the parable of the good Samaritan, GOP Jesus is approached by a woman asking for healing, and responds: "but who would pay for it?" the woman has no money so GOP Jesus responds "Yes, it’s a sad story, but it does not make me responsible."

It has similarities to the Who Would Jesus Bomb? slogans used during the early 2000s.

See also
Supply-Side Jesus, a similar concept drawn by Don Simpson for comedian and former United States Senator Al Franken in his 2003 satirical book Lies and the Lying Liars Who Tell Them

References

Reference bibliography

External links
 GOP Jesus

American political satire
Cultural depictions of Jesus
Internet humor
Religious parodies and satires